The 1901 Connecticut Aggies football team represented Connecticut Agricultural College, now the University of Connecticut, in the 1901 college football season.  This was the sixth year that the school fielded a football team.  The Aggies were led by third year head coach T. D. Knowles, and completed the season with a record of 8–2.

Schedule

References

Connecticut
UConn Huskies football seasons
Connecticut Aggies football